Let's Make a New Dope Deal is a 1980 comedy album recorded by Cheech & Chong. Originally released on LP, 8-track and cassette in 1980, the long out-of-print album was finally released on CD on November 15, 2005, along with another long-awaited out-of-print (since the early 1990s) album, Sleeping Beauty.

A single for "Bloat On", a parody of "Float On" by R&B group The Floaters was released with a non-album B-side entitled "Just Say 'Right On'" with a picture sleeve depicting animated overweight versions of Cheech and Chong. This was originally released in 1977 on the Ode label, which had switched distribution from A&M to Epic/CBS, and was produced by Lou Adler. The rest of the album may have been recorded shortly before filming began for Up In Smoke, with then-current references to Peter Frampton, punk rock, and Star Wars noticeable during some of the routines.

Track listing

References

1980 albums
Cheech & Chong albums
Warner Records albums
1980s comedy albums